Zeytinburnu is a rapid transit station on the M1 line of the Istanbul Metro. Even though it is named Zeytinburnu, the station is not located within Zeytinburnu district borders but within Bakırköy district borders close to Zeytinburnu. It was opened on 31 January 1994 as part of the Otogar-Zeytinburnu extension and is one of the five stations of this extension.

Layout

References

Istanbul metro stations
Railway stations opened in 1994
Zeytinburnu